Joseph Denis Lucien Claude Robert (August 10, 1928 – January 6, 2007) was a Canadian professional  ice hockey forward who played 23 games in the National Hockey League for the Montreal Canadiens. He was born in Montreal, Quebec.

External links

Obituary at LostHockey.com

1928 births
2007 deaths
Canadian expatriate ice hockey players in the United States
Canadian ice hockey forwards
Cincinnati Mohawks (AHL) players
Fort Wayne Komets players
French Quebecers
Montreal Canadiens players
New Westminster Royals (WHL) players
Ottawa Senators (QSHL) players
Quebec Aces (QSHL) players
Ice hockey people from Montreal
Toledo Mercurys players